These are the official results of the Men's 20 km Walk event at the 1996 Summer Olympics in Atlanta, Georgia.

Medalists

Abbreviations
All times shown are in hours:minutes:seconds

Records

Results

See also
 1993 Men's World Championships 20 km Walk (Stuttgart)
 1994 Men's European Championships 20 km Walk (Helsinki)
 1995 Men's World Championships 20 km Walk (Gothenburg)
 1996 Race Walking Year Ranking
 1997 Men's World Championships 20 km Walk (Athens)
 1998 Men's European Championships 20 km Walk (Budapest)
 1999 Men's World Championships 20 km Walk (Seville)

References

External links
 Official Report
 Results

W
Racewalking at the Olympics
Men's events at the 1996 Summer Olympics